The Cyrus McCormick Farm and Workshop is on the family farm of inventor Cyrus Hall McCormick known as Walnut Grove. Cyrus Hall McCormick improved and patented the mechanical reaper, which eventually led to the creation of the combine harvester. The farm is near Steele's Tavern and Raphine, close to the northern border of Rockbridge and Augusta counties in the U.S. state of Virginia, and is currently a museum run by the Virginia Agricultural Experimental Station of Virginia Tech.

History

The farm originally covered 532 acres with buildings centered on a scant 5 acres. On the farm eight out of the nine original buildings are still standing, many of which have been renovated since the farm was created in 1822 by Robert McCormick (1780–1846). The eight existing buildings include a grist mill, blacksmith shop, slave quarters, carriage house, manor house, smoke house, schoolroom, and housekeeper's quarters. In the original construction of the farm there was also an ice house which was demolished in the 1960s. Each of these different buildings played a specific role in the daily routine of the Cyrus McCormick farm. The grist mill, built prior to 1800, was used to grind wheat for flour. The blacksmith shop was used to build and repair all the farm implements needed by the McCormick family and was where Cyrus McCormick engineered his reaper. Slave quarters served as the home for the forty one slaves that the McCormick family owned. Furthermore, the carriage house was used as a garage for the carriages and other wheeled vehicles. The manor house is centrally located on the farm and was constructed of brick in 1822, making it the first building on the McCormick farm. Behind the brick manor house was the smoke house where meat was dried and smoked to preserve it through the winter. Refrigeration was not introduced until the late 19th century. The McCormick family also maintained a school on their property for neighboring children.

The McCormick Farm at Walnut Grove is known as the birthplace of the mechanical reaper, the predecessor to the combine harvester. Cyrus McCormick reportedly designed, built, and tested his reaper all within six weeks at Walnut Grove, although the design may have been merely an improvement upon the similar device developed by his father and his brother Leander over 20 years.  Shortly after constructing his first reaper he went on to harvest his first crop with it later that year. After building his first reaper, Cyrus constantly went back to the drawing board to revise and improve his basic design, coming out with new models almost every decade.

After his father's death, Cyrus McCormick moved his base of operations from Rockbridge County, Virginia to Chicago, Illinois in 1847 because of the fertile prairie soil in the midwestern United States. In 1859, Cyrus was joined by his brothers Leander James McCormick and William Sanderson McCormick to form the company Cyrus H. McCormick and Brothers. By the end of the 19th century, McCormick's company had built a primitive combine, which could harvest grain even faster and cheaper than older reapers.  Prior to inventing the reaper, farmers could only harvest  a day; after the reaper was invented, farmers could harvest  a day using less manual labor. The mechanical reaper did not require a family to toil all day to harvest crops. Instead, a single farmer merely operated the machine and the reaper would do the rest of the work. His work in mechanical reapers and harvesting techniques allowed farmers to cultivate plots of land bigger than ever thought possible.
In 1902, the company was merged with competitor Deering Harvester Company and (smaller ones) to form International Harvester.

Preservation
The farm remained in the McCormick family up to 1954, before being donated to Virginia Polytechnic Institute as an agricultural center and Farm Memorial.  Currently, the schoolroom has vintage textbooks, toys, and other school supplies dating from the 1830s. 
It was declared a National Historic Landmark in 1964.

See also
List of National Historic Landmarks in Virginia
National Register of Historic Places listings in Rockbridge County, Virginia

References

External links
Shenandoah Valley Agricultural Research & Extension Center: McCormick Farm official site
McCormick Farm and Workship, one photo, at Virginia DHR
Shenandoah Valley Agricultural Research & Extension Center: McCormick Farm
Garden of Praise: CYRUS McCORMICK

 
Farms on the National Register of Historic Places in Virginia
National Historic Landmarks in Virginia
Museums in Rockbridge County, Virginia
Houses completed in 1822
Industrial buildings completed in 1809
Open-air museums in Virginia
Farm museums in Virginia
Mill museums in Virginia
McCormick
National Register of Historic Places in Rockbridge County, Virginia
Historic districts on the National Register of Historic Places in Virginia
 
Grinding mills on the National Register of Historic Places in Virginia
1822 establishments in Virginia
Slave cabins and quarters in the United States
Blacksmith shops